Al "The Bronx Beauty" Singer (September 6, 1909 – April 20, 1961) was an American boxer who won the world lightweight championship in 1930.

Early life and career
Singer was born in a tenement on Broome Street, part of the Jewish section in New York's Lower East Side on September 6, 1909.  He was one of four sons and a daughter born to  an ambitious ladies' garment entrepreneur who would keep his large family in America's middle class.  Singer, an all round athlete who loved basketball, was discovered by boxing trainers Harry Drucker and Hymie Caplan after his tenth amateur bout which included a great showing in his first outing against the New York State Bantamweight champion, Jimmy Cruze. As an amateur boxer, he won the Metropolitan AAU featherweight title.   Singer had unsurpassed grace and a studied style in the ring, and he could punch with authority, but unlike the great lightweight Benny Leonard, to whom he was often compared, he could not take a strong punch and was considered to have a "glass jaw".  His quick rise to fame, and equally quick demise could be explained by these competing characteristics.

Quick rise to boxing prominence
Debuting as a professional in Brooklyn with a knockout of Jim Reilly on July 2, 1927, Singer went undefeated in his first two years as a professional.  His affectionate New York fans dubbed him "The Bronx Beauty" for both his looks and exceptional grace in the ring.  Though Singer was young and had stayed far distant from crime, his exceptional winning record caught the eye of the New York mob, who hoped to bring him to a championship as quickly as possible. Most reference books on Singer noted that in 1928, two men came to his training camp and asked to meet with his manager Harry Drucker.  Accepting a ride with the men, Drucker was never heard from again, and Singer came under the influence of the mob, who many believed fixed a few of his early fights. He performed exceptionally well against Lou Moscowitz at Madison Square Garden and Pete Zivic at St. Nicholas in late 1928, knocking them out in five and six rounds respectively. In his first real feature match on September 14, 1928, Singer and the exceptionally skilled Tony Canzoneri, former holder of the featherweight world title, battled to a 10-round draw, satisfying an impressed audience and spotlighting Singer as a potential feather or lightweight contender. In his career, Singer won 61 of 72 pro fights (25 by KO), drawing twice, and losing nine.

In February and March 1929, Singer faced former 1927 world bantamweight champion Bud Taylor at Madison Square Garden, winning in a fourth round disqualification and a ten-round points decision.  In Singer's win by disqualification, Taylor landed a low left hook to the body, 52 seconds into the fourth, that caused Singer to drop to his knees in pain. The bout was fast, furious, and close in the opening rounds. In their ten-round bout on March 15, before 20,000 at the Garden, the fighting was close, but Taylor's attempts to end the bout with hooks to the body were not adequate to slow down Singer, who was permitted to land a few rights to the jaw of Taylor, gaining essential points in the closely scored bout.

In a non-title bout on July 24, 1929, before a crowd of around 29,000, Singer defeated Frenchman Andre Routis, reigning NBA world featherweight champion, in an impressive second-round technical knockout at Ebbetts Field in Brooklyn.  Singer first floored the Frenchman with a count of five from a right to the jaw preceded by a right left combination, that was followed by a count of three with another right after Routis resumed boxing.  On his third trip to the canvas, the referee called a technical knockout.

Loss to Kid Chocolate, August, 1929
On August 29, 1929, Singer lost an important twelve round bout with Black Cuban boxer Kid Chocolate, at the Polo Grounds in New York with 50,000 in attendance. It was a swift, clean fight that featured no knockdowns, but studied technique and style.  In the fifth and the eighth, Chocolate landed two powerful rights to the head of Singer that nearly staggered him, but he stayed on his feet.  In the second and eleventh, Singer boxed Chocolate around the ring, but at the end of each round Chocolate answered with a flurry of his own. Singer appeared better in the early rounds, and was the aggressor particularly in the second, fourth and fifth.  In the seventh, eighth and ninth, Chocolate rallied, using his right with enough effect to gain a points advantage from which Singer could not recover.  Chocolate clearly took the twelfth, conceding the tenth by a hair to Singer.  The decision was unpopular with the New York crowd, who may have been aware that Chocolate effectively blocked a large number of the blows that Singer appeared to land.  Chocolate let Singer take the lead, slowly wearing him down, and using his best defense against him.

Capturing the world lightweight championship against Sammy Mandell, July 1930

Singer captured the World Lightweight Championship on July 17, 1930, before a crowd of 35,000 at Yankee Stadium, with a first-round knockout (1:46) of champion Sammy Mandell. Though both boxers started the match boxing cautiously, Singer dropped Mandell with a left hook to the jaw in less than a minute of fighting.  Three more times Mandell went down to the mat for short counts, scarcely able to raise his hands in defense.  The final knockdown came with a crushing one two punch to the jaw.  Mandell had defended his four-year claim to the lightweight crown only a few times, and claimed that the weight loss required to make weight had sapped his strength.

Devastating loss to Jimmy McLarnin, September 1930

Against the better judgement of many, Singer accepted a non-title bout with boxing sensation Jimmy McLarnin before a crowd of around 25,000 on September 2, 1930.  McLarnin flattened Singer in the third round with a right to the jaw. Although Singer fought well in the opening round, dropping his opponent for an instant from a right, he foolishly decided to fight toe to toe with the stronger McLarnin in the third round. McLarnin had at least a five-pound advantage, and a small but significant advantage in reach.   A lightning right to the jaw dropped Singer for a count of nine.  When he arose and went into a brief clinch, McLarnin threw a left hook to the jaw to counter a right from Singer that missed, and Singer went down for the count.  A Doctor at the scene, who inspected Singer, said the blow may have affected his upper spine and caused a momentary partial paralysis, not uncharacteristic of a knockout.

Upset loss of the world lightweight championship to Tony Canzoneri, November 1930

He surrendered the title on November 14, 1930 to Tony Canzoneri in a knockout only 1:06 into the first round.  Many believe Singer should have taken more than two months to recover from the bruising loss he took from McLarnin the previous September.  The upset came as Singer was designated the early betting favorite at 12-5.  Coming out of a clinch, Canzoneri threw a left hook to Singer's mouth, and then one to his chin which snapped back his head, and put him down for the count.  Singer was unable to come to his feet without collapsing.

Recovering from his loss of the title on June 18, 1931, Singer defeated Lew Massey before a crowd of 6,395, at Madison Square Garden in a ten-round points decision.  Observing how he threw jabs and punches nearly at will, the Associated Press gave Singer eight of ten rounds, allowing Massey only the seventh when he switched to infighting.  Singer scored with hard rights in the tenth. Other reporters considered the boxing fairly close, noting that with his reach, height, and weight advantage, Singer  should have won more decisively.

Loss to world featherweight champion Battling Battalino, December 1931

Singer lost decisively to Battling Battalino, reigning New York State Athletic Commission (NYSAC) world featherweight champion, before a crowd of 17,000 at New York's Madison Square Garden on December 11, 1931.  Battalino may have bobbed and weaved away from Singer's early volleys in the first, and was likely shaken by a blow or two, but his counterattack was devastating to Singer.  Though Singer started strong very early in the opening round, he was soon put down three times by Battalino, and went down in the second from a series of rights to the chin for a count of seven.  After he rose, he was chased around the ring by Battalino who put him down again with a right to the chin for a count of four, just before the referee justifiably called the bout a technical knockout and helped move Singer to his corner.   Singer's retreat from Battalino after he was first put down, his inability to defend himself, and his struggle to mount an attack, indicated a boxer who had, at least for the moment, lost most of his physical faculties.  Both boxers were above the featherweight limit preventing any chance of the match being a featherweight title match.  The match ended any of Singer's championship aspirations.

Attempted comeback, October–November 1935
Four years later, Singer tried a comeback from October–November 1935 under a new manager, Leon See, winning four straight matches, but against strictly second rate opponents.  He achieved a fourth-round technical knockout against Buckey Keyes on October 14, flooring his opponent in the second and third rounds.  In a final victory, Singer retired after defeating Johnny Toomy on November 11 in a fifth-round technical knockout.

Life after boxing

Singer served in WWII, fighting a number of exhibitions for the soldiers.  He was stationed at Camp Upton in New York but received a medical discharge due to eye trouble.  He married the former show girl, Billy Boze in 1947.  Having earned around a quarter million from boxing in his lifetime, Singer tried various businesses in his thirties and forties including sales, restaurants, real estate, and theater, owning several Cabarets.  He was appointed to a judgeship by the New York State Boxing Commission in 1955.

On April 20, 1961, he died of a heart attack in his New York City apartment at age 51. Singer, who was Jewish, was inducted into the International Jewish Sports Hall of Fame in 2006.

Professional boxing record

See also
Lineal championship
List of lightweight boxing champions
List of select Jewish boxers

References

External links

Cyber Boxing Zone bio and record
Jewish Sports bio

  

1909 births
1961 deaths
Boxers from New York City
Lightweight boxers
World lightweight boxing champions
World boxing champions
Jewish American boxers
Jewish boxers
American male boxers
20th-century American Jews